Ginhart is a German hamlet (Weiler) of the municipality of Mengkofen, Dingolfing-Landau district, Lower Bavaria, Bavaria. As of the last census of population, 1987, it had a population of 28.

Overview
Ginhart had been a part of the municipality of Asbach until 1970. When Asbach was split up between Süßkofen and Laberweinting in 1970, Ginhart was added to the municipality of Süßkofen. Süßkofen was integrated into Mengkofen on May 1, 1978.

References

Dingolfing-Landau
Villages in Bavaria